Elsinore is a neighbourhood near the north end of the city of Edmonton, Alberta, Canada.  It is one of the neighbourhoods within the Edmonton district of Castledowns.  To the north lies largely rural, undeveloped land within the Edmonton city limits.  Also located a short distance north of the neighbourhood is Canadian Forces Base Edmonton.

The eastern boundary of the neighbourhood runs along 97 Street.  This main artery extends all the way to downtown Edmonton to the south, and passes within a few city blocks of the Northern Alberta Institute of Technology (NAIT) about half way between Elsinore and downtown.  Canadian Forces Base Edmonton is located a short distance to the north of the city, with easy access along 97 Street.

Substantially all residences in the neighbourhood were built after 1985.

According to the 2005 municipal census, 82% of the residences are single-family dwellings.  The remaining 18% are duplexes.  Substantially all residences in the neighbourhood are owner-occupied.

Roughly 40% of the residents have lived in the neighbourhood for five years or less.

Demographics 

Surrounding neighbourhoods

References

External links 
 Elsinore Neighbourhood Profile
 Elsinore Demographic Profile

Neighbourhoods in Edmonton